is a Japanese football player who currently plays for Kawasaki Frontale.

International career
On 23 December 2009 he was named in the squad for Japan's 2011 AFC Asian Cup qualification against Yemen, and made his full international debut for the team in the fixture on 6 January 2010.  He was part of the Japan's team at the 2012 Olympics.

Career statistics

Club 
Updated to 5 November 2022.

1Includes Emperor's Cup.

2Includes J. League Cup.

3Includes Suruga Bank Championship.

International

Honours

Club
Kashima Antlers
 J.League Cup: 2012, 2013, 2015
 Suruga Bank Championship: 2013
Cerezo Osaka
J.League Cup: 2017
Emperor's Cup: 2017
Kawasaki Frontale
J1 League: 2020, 2021
Emperor's Cup: 2020
J.League Cup: 2019

Japan
Japan U-23
Asian Games : 2010

References

External links

 
 Japan National Football Team Database
 
 Kazuya Yamamura – at Ryutsu Keizai University FC Official site
 Profile at Cerezo Osaka
 

1989 births
Living people
Ryutsu Keizai University alumni
Association football people from Nagasaki Prefecture
Japanese footballers
Japan youth international footballers
Japan international footballers
J1 League players
J2 League players
Kashima Antlers players
Cerezo Osaka players
Kawasaki Frontale players
Asian Games medalists in football
Footballers at the 2010 Asian Games
Asian Games gold medalists for Japan
Olympic footballers of Japan
Footballers at the 2012 Summer Olympics
Medalists at the 2010 Asian Games
Association football defenders
Association football midfielders
Universiade bronze medalists for Japan
Universiade medalists in football
Medalists at the 2009 Summer Universiade
Medalists at the 2011 Summer Universiade